Abiathar Peak is a mountain peak with an elevation of  in the northeastern section of Yellowstone National Park, in the Absaroka Range of the U.S. state of Wyoming. The peak was named by members of the 1885 Hague Geological Survey to honor Charles Abiathar White, a geologist and paleontologist who had participated in early western geological surveys. White never visited Yellowstone.

See also
 Mountains and mountain ranges of Yellowstone National Park

Notes

Mountains of Wyoming
Mountains of Yellowstone National Park
Mountains of Park County, Wyoming